American Icon: The Fall of Roger Clemens and the Rise of Steroids in America's Pastime is a book written by Teri Thompson, Michael O'Keeffe, Nathaniel Vinton & Christian Red, four sportswriters from the New York Daily News, that was released in 2009. It focuses on seven-time Cy Young Award-winning pitcher Roger Clemens' alleged use of steroids, relationship with trainer Brian McNamee, and both their testimonies in front of Congress regarding the Mitchell Report (2007). The book received a very positive review from Michiko Kakutani of The New York Times. Clemens gave a rare radio interview to ESPN's Mike and Mike in the Morning on the book's release date to combat its claims.

References

External links
 American Icon by Teri Thompson, Nathaniel Vinton, Michael O'Keeffe, and Christian Red - eBook - Random House

Major League Baseball books
Current affairs books
2009 non-fiction books
Alfred A. Knopf books